MEVAC (Middleburgh Emergency Volunteer Ambulance Corps.) is a volunteer driven Emergency Medical Service organization in Upstate New York (United States) rendering emergency ambulance service to the Towns of Broome, Blenheim, Middleburgh, village of Middleburgh, a portion of Fulton and a portion of the Town of Berne that is covered by the Huntersland Fire Department. MEVAC provides EMS service at both the ALS and BLS levels. The pre-hospital care is provided by New York State Department of Health certified Paramedics, AEMT-CC's, EMT-B's who are assisted by non-certified trained Personnel.

MEVAC gives special first aid instruction in handling and attending the sick and disabled to all persons who may at any time be called upon to assist in the maintenance and operation of such emergency ambulance service.

MEVAC conducts its operations without profit to the members thereof and co-operates with nearby municipalities during any emergency.

Ambulance services in the United States
Medical and health organizations based in New York (state)